Vicor Music Corporation is a Filipino record label. The name is a combination of the names of the founders, the cousins Vic del Rosario and Orly Ilacad. Initially an independent record label, it is currently owned by Viva Communications.

Vicor also released video karaoke VCDs versions of the label's songs in the Philippines.

References

External links

 
Companies based in Pasig
Philippine record labels
Pop record labels
Viva Records (Philippines)
Philippine companies established in 1966
Entertainment companies established in 1966